Gex 3: Deep Cover Gecko is a 1999 platform video game and the third and final installment of the Gex video game series, which released in 1999 and 2000 for the PlayStation, Nintendo 64, and Game Boy Color. Its protagonist, Gex, is a wisecracking, pop culture enthusiast voiced by Danny John-Jules in the UK and European releases and comedian Dana Gould, reprising his role from former Gex games, for the American release. Gameplay is set in Gex's secret hideout, the Mission Control overworld, which is overseen by Gex's butler, Alfred the Turtle. Playboy model Marliece Andrada plays Gex's kidnapped companion, Agent Xtra, the only live-action character, who is featured in brief full-motion video sequences on the PlayStation version. The plot follows Gex's return to the Media Dimension to rescue Agent Xtra from Rez, Gex's arch-nemesis from the previous games.

Developer Crystal Dynamics conceived Gex 3 as a sequel to 1998's Gex: Enter the Gecko and incorporated unused elements of the game's design into Gex 3. Advancements in the utilization of available technology allowed Gex 3 to feature a set of bigger levels, more on-screen characters, different textures, and a retooled camera system over its predecessors that maximizes gameplay improvements with consideration to the hardware limitations of the time. Certain aspects from the original Gex were brought back as well, such as the addition of secret levels and bug collectibles.

Gex 3 was met with mixed-to-positive reviews from critics, with a fair amount of criticism directed at the differences between the Nintendo 64 and PlayStation versions.

Gameplay
Gameplay remains similar to  Gex: Enter the Gecko, with the addition of certain vehicles, such as a tank, a camel, and a snowboard, as well as swimming and gliding abilities available in certain levels. Like Enter the Gecko, new stages are unlocked by collecting TV remotes. Unlike Enter the Gecko, in which Gex can obtain a variety of themed collectibles throughout a level (e.g. skulls, TNT plungers, carrots, TVs, and police plates), Gex can only collect bugs, the same collectible from the original Gex. Upon receiving certain power-ups, Gex gains the ability spit fire and ice. When losing a life, Gex retains only the amount of bugs collected up to the latest checkpoint; if the level has no checkpoint, Gex starts at zero. Due to Gex 3'''s limitation to 100 bugs per level, collecting the required bugs is more difficult than in Enter the Gecko. Similar to the first Gex game, collecting footprint icons will increase Gex's energy. Unlike the first game, Gex retains the energy (eight hits total) after collecting 100 footprints. Levels are accessed via a more expansive hub, with more areas unlocked as the player collects remotes from each of the levels. During bonus stages, players can unlock and control three alternate characters, Rex, Cuz, and Alfred.

Synopsis
Characters
Four new characters appear in this sequel. Agent Xtra, a live-action female government Spy and whom Gex must help rescue from the clutches of Rez. Gex is also joined by his faithful butler, Alfred the Tortoise, who is a slight character reference to Bruce Wayne's butler Alfred Pennyworth. Alfred basically helps around and maintains Gex's secret lair which is known as "Mission Control". Alfred can be found in parts of most levels and tail whipping him gives useful advice. The two last characters are Rex, a red Dinosaur who Gex unfroze from a block of ice in the "Holiday Broadcasting" channel, and Gex's cousin Cuz who Gex rescued from gangsters in the "Gangster TV" channel.

Plot
While watching television, Gex discovers that his partner and lover Agent Xtra, now the head of the "TV Terrorist Defense Unit", has been reported missing. Xtra herself manages to contact Gex and inform him that Rez has returned once again and kidnapped her to get to him. Through his secret lair, Gex returns to the Media Dimension and circumnavigates numerous television channels with help from his butler Alfred and in the process frees and befriends Rez's prisoners, Rex and Cuz.

Together, they find Rez and challenge him to a final battle. In the aftermath, Rez is destroyed once and for all, and Gex saves Xtra. In the PlayStation version's ending as Xtra tells Gex of her time in the Media Dimension, Alfred attempts to warn Gex of a world emergency, but is ignored. The game ends with Gex and Xtra making love.

Development
Crystal Dynamics wanted Gex 3, the sequel to Gex: Enter the Gecko and the third game in the Gex series of platform video games, to raise the bar for focusing more on its story than the series' previous entries did. They also wanted to further put emphasis on the title character's personality by giving him "over-the-top animations", according to Crystal Dynamics' Product Marketing Manager, Chip Blundell. Several of the in-game mechanics used in levels were concepts that were thought of during the development of Gex 3D, but could not be included due to issues with time constraints. Lead Designer Chris Tremmel wanted the gameplay of Gex 3 to hearken back to the series' initial roots as a 2D side-scrolling platformer. To achieve this, he included side-scrolling minigames in addition to the main platforming parts, in order to make level missions less monotonous. According to Tremmel, most people who had played Gex 3D weren't entirely invested into going out of their way to locate all of the collectibles in each stage as they were with other collectathon platformers like Super Mario 64 and Banjo-Kazooie; thus, the developers made three core collectibles that stay consistent throughout the entire game and significantly aid the player in completing it. The hub world used to access stages was also retooled from the previous game and changed from an empty environment with several doors leading to levels to being more like a level in itself with items and secrets hidden within it.

With Gex 3, the developers tried to push the limits of the PlayStation's hardware further than they had with Gex 3D. For instance, they made the game's levels bigger than they were in the previous entry, having found a way to increase level sizes by one-fifth and include more enemies per stage while maintaining a high framerate. Textures also make use of environment mapping, something which Tremmel initially did not think that the PlayStation could smoothly handle; according to him, he suggested using it to the programmers as a joke, not thinking that they could legitimately pull it off with the hardware limitations of the PlayStation, but found that the programmers had already begun working on implementing it the next day. The technique was used primarily for metal surfaces, such as certain enemies and Gex's shield and metallic armor that he wears at points in the game. A particular area of focus for Crystal Dynamics was improving the game's 3D camera system, which was frequently criticized in Gex 3D for being glitchy and difficult to use at times. Rather than including a multitude of camera options, they opted simply to feature a single system which was simple and did not work against the desires of the player.

Agent Xtra was played by actress Marliece Andrada, best known for starring in the TV show Baywatch.

Reception

The PlayStation version of Gex 3: Deep Cover Gecko received "favorable" reviews, while the Game Boy Color and Nintendo 64 versions received "mixed" reviews, according to the review aggregation website GameRankings. The N64 version was criticized for stuttering frame rates despite "PlayStation-esque graphics", not taking advantage of the analog stick, and failing to compare to the 3D platformer competition on the Nintendo 64 such as Super Mario 64. Whether the player slightly presses the joystick forward or presses it all the way, Gex runs full speed ahead. Running on the less powerful PlayStation, Gex 3 was rated higher due to less 3D platformer competition and impressive graphics. Next Generation said of the PlayStation version, "In the end, Gex 3'' is a passable game – barely. Everything about the title is cookie cutter from beginning to end."

References

External links
 
 
 

1999 video games
3D platform games
Action-adventure games
Crave Entertainment games
Crystal Dynamics games
Game Boy Color games
Eidos Interactive games
Gex (series)
Nintendo 64 games
PlayStation (console) games
Video game sequels
Video games developed in the United States
Video games scored by Burke Trieschmann